Florin Lucian Tănase (born 30 December 1994) is a Romanian professional footballer who plays as an attacking midfielder or a forward for UAE Pro League club Al Jazira.

He started out as a senior in the third league at Voluntari, where he was loaned from Viitorul Constanța in 2013. Tănase went on to appear in over 80 games in all competitions for the latter, before transferring to FCSB in 2016.
 
Internationally, he made his full debut for Romania in a 1–0 friendly victory over Albania in May 2014, aged 19.

Club career

Viitorul Constanța
On 23 February 2014, aged 19, Tănase scored his first Liga I goal in Viitorul Constanța's 2–1 away win against Dinamo București.

FCSB
On 8 August 2016, FC Steaua București signed Tănase on a five-year deal for a reported €1.5 million transfer fee, with his former club retaining 25% interest on a future move. He was assigned the number 10 jersey and scored on debut four days later, his goal aiding to a 2–0 away victory over Botoșani.

Tănase netted his first European goal for the Roș-albaștrii on 2 August 2017, in the UEFA Champions League third qualifying round 4–1 away victory over Viktoria Plzeň. In the 2020–21 Liga I season he scored 24 times, becoming the league's top scorer and being named in the Team of the Year.

On 25 April 2022, Tănase managed the first hat-trick of his professional career in a 4–0 away victory over his former team Viitorul Constanța, now named Farul. He finished as the Liga I top scorer for the second year in a row, after netting 20 times.

Al Jazira
On 6 August 2022, Emirati club Al Jazira announced the signing of Tănase after meeting his €3 million release clause.

International career
On 31 May 2014, Tănase earned his first cap for Romania in a 1–0 win over Albania by entering as an 83rd-minute substitute for Alexandru Maxim. He appeared intermittently for the nation in the following years, as he only scored his first goal on 25 March 2021, in a 3–2 defeat of North Macedonia in the 2022 FIFA World Cup qualifying stage.

Style of play
Tănase is a versatile footballer who can occupy several positions along the front-line, but has stated that prefers to be deployed as an advanced playmaker. Romanian manager and former player Gheorghe Hagi regarded him as one of the most promising talents of his generation; in spite of that, Tănase has been accused by opponents and media alike of excessive diving, especially during his time at FCSB.

Career statistics

Club

International

Scores and results list Romania's goal tally first, score column indicates score after each Tănase goal.

Honours

Viitorul Constanța
Liga I: 2016–17

FCSB
Cupa României: 2019–20
Supercupa României runner-up: 2020

Individual
Liga I top scorer: 2020–21, 2021–22
Liga I Team of the Season: 2020–21, 2021–22
Digi Sport Liga I Player of the Month: December 2017

References

External links

1994 births
Living people
People from Găești
Sportspeople from Pitești
Romanian footballers
Association football forwards
Association football wingers
Liga I players
Liga III players
UAE Pro League players
FC Viitorul Constanța players
FC Voluntari players
FC Steaua București players
Al Jazira Club players
Romania under-21 international footballers
Romania international footballers
Romanian expatriate footballers
Expatriate footballers in the United Arab Emirates
Romanian expatriate sportspeople in the United Arab Emirates